Sant'Antonio, Italian for Saint Anthony, most often refers to places named after Saint Anthony of Padua or Sant'Antonio Abate:

People

Places

Switzerland
Sant'Antonio, Bellinzona, municipality in canton of Ticino
Sant'Antonio (Poschiavo), civil parish of Poschiavo, in canton of Graubünden
St. Antönien, municipality in canton of Graubünden
St. Antönien Ascharina (or Ascharina), civil parish of St. Antönien, in canton of Graubünden

Italy

Churches in Italy

Basilica di Sant'Antonio di Padova, basilica church and major shrine in Padua, Veneto
Sant'Antonio di Padova a Circonvallazione Appia, church in Rome, Lazio
Sant'Antonio, church in Faenza, province of Ravenna, Emilia-Romagna
Sant'Antonio in Polesine, convent in Ferrara, Emilia-Romagna
Sant'Antonio da Padova in Via Merulana, minor basilica church in Rome, Lazio
Sant'Antonio da Padova in Via Tuscolana, church in Rome, Lazio
Sant'Antonio dei Portoghesi, church in Rome, Lazio
Sant'Antonio da Padova, oratory in Siena, Tuscany 
Sant'Antonio di Ranverso, abbey in Buttigliera Alta, province of Turin, Piedmont
Sant'Antonio, Vaglio Basilicata, church in region of Basilicata

Municipalities (Comuni)
Aci Sant'Antonio, in province of Catania 
Isola Sant'Antonio, in province of Alessandria 
Rocchetta Sant'Antonio, in province of Foggia 
Sant'Antonio Abate, in province of Naples
Sant'Antonio di Gallura, in province of Olbia-Tempio 
Villa Sant'Antonio, in province of Oristano

Civil parishes (Frazioni)

Abruzzo
Colle Sant'Antonio, in Bucchianico (CH) 
Ponte Sant'Antonio, in Penne (PE)
Sant'Antonio, in Gamberale (CH) 
Sant'Antonio Abate, in Vasto (CH) 
Sant'Antonio Bosco, in Pescocostanzo (AQ)

Apulia
Sant'Antonio d'Ascuola, in Monopoli (BA)

Basilicata
Sant'Antonio Casalini, in Bella (PZ)

Calabria
Sant'Antonio, in Cleto (CS)
Sant'Antonio, in Gioiosa Ionica (RC)
Sant'Antonio, in Motta San Giovanni (RC)

Campania
Borgo Sant'Antonio Abate, in Pietravairano (CE) 
Sant'Antonio, in Apice (BN)
Sant'Antonio, in Sala Consilina (SA)
Sant'Antonio, in Torchiara (SA)
Sant'Antonio a Picenzia, in Pontecagnano (SA)

Emilia-Romagna
Sant'Antonio, in Castell'Arquato (PC)
Sant'Antonio, in Medicina (BO)
Sant'Antonio, in Ravenna (RA)
Sant'Antonio a Trebbia, in Piacenza (PC) 
Sant'Antonio di Crocette, in Pavullo nel Frignano (MO)
Sant'Antonio in Gualdo, in Castrocaro Terme (FC)
Sant'Antonio in Mercadello, in Novi di Modena (MO)

Friuli-Venezia Giulia
Sant'Antonio, in Porcia (PN)
Sant'Antonio, in Tarvisio (UD)
Sant'Antonio in Bosco, in San Dorligo della Valle (TS)

Lazio
Sant'Antonio, in Guidonia Montecelio (RM)
Sant'Antonio, in Torrice (FR)
Sant'Antonio Abate, in Castelnuovo Parano (FR)
Sant'Antonio Casilina Nord, in Ferentino (FR)

Liguria
Sant'Antonio, in Levanto (SP)
Sant'Antonio, in Ventimiglia (IM)

Marche
Borgo Sant'Antonio, in Visso (MC)
Sant'Antonio, in Folignano (AP)
Villa Sant'Antonio, in Ascoli Piceno and Castel di Lama (AP) 

Lombardy
Sant'Antonio, in Grone (BG)
Sant'Antonio, in Montichiari (BS)
Sant'Antonio, in Porto Mantovano (MN)
Sant'Antonio, in Tartano (SO)
Sant'Antonio, in Valfurva (SO)
Sant'Antonio Abbandonato, in Brembilla (BG) 
Sant'Antonio d'Adda, in Caprino Bergamasco (BG)
Sant'Antonio Morignone, in Valdisotto (SO)

Piedmont
Borgo Sant'Antonio, in Santa Vittoria d'Alba (CN) 
Sant'Antonio, in Basaluzzo (AL)
Sant'Antonio, in Canelli (AT)
Sant'Antonio, in Castellamonte (TO)
Sant'Antonio, in Cavour (TO)
Sant'Antonio, in Fontaneto d'Agogna (NO)
Sant'Antonio, in Magliano Alfieri (CN)
Sant'Antonio, in Marsaglia (CN) 
Sant'Antonio, in Monticello d'Alba (CN)
Sant'Antonio, in Odalengo Grande (AL)
Sant'Antonio, in Villafranca d'Asti (AT)
Sant'Antonio Aradolo, in Borgo San Dalmazzo (CN)
Sant'Antonio Baligio, in Fossano (CN) 
Sant'Antonio Casa Morca, in Riva Valdobbia (VC)

Sardinia
Sant'Antonio di Santadi, in Arbus (VS)

Sicily
Sant'Antonio, in Barcellona Pozzo di Gotto (ME)
Sant'Antonio, in Modica (RG)

Trentino-Alto Adige
Sant'Antonio di Mavignola, in Pinzolo (TN)

Tuscany
Alpe di Sant'Antonio, in Molazzana (LU)
Cerreta Sant'Antonio, in Seravezza (LU)
Sant'Antonio, in Campagnatico (GR)
Sant'Antonio, in Carrara (MS)

Umbria
Casali Sant'Antonio, in Cascia (PG) 
Sant'Antonio di Rasina, in Gualdo Tadino (PG)

Veneto
Sant'Antonio, in Thiene (VI)
Sant'Antonio, in Valli del Pasubio (VI)  
Sant'Antonio Tortal, in Trichiana (BL)
Villanova Sant'Antonio, in Fossalta di Portogruaro (VE)

See also
San Antonio (disambiguation)
Santo Antônio (disambiguation)
Saint Anthony (disambiguation)
Sant'Antonino (disambiguation)